Fernando Fernandes may refer to:

Fernando Fernandes (footballer) (born 1971), Angolan footballer
Fernando Fernandes (hurdler) (1920–1990s), Portuguese track and field athlete
Fernando Fernandes (runner) (born 1983), Brazilian distance runner; see 2005 South American Championships in Athletics
Fernando Fernandes de Pádua, Brazilian paracanoiest, TV host and model

See also
Fernando Fernández (disambiguation)